Shabi Khun Meleh Sorkheh (also Romanized as Shabī Khūn Meleh Sorkheh) is a village in Robat Rural District, in the Central District of Khorramabad County, Lorestan Province, Iran. At the 2006 census, its population was 49, in 9 families.

References 

Towns and villages in Khorramabad County